Lili & Susie (initially Lili & Sussie) is a Swedish pop duo composed of the sisters Lili Päivärinta and Susie Päivärinta. They scored a number of hit singles in the late 1980s and early 1990s, their biggest hit being "Oh Mama" in 1987. Their 1987 song "Oh Mama" spent six weeks in the top five of the Swedish singles chart. They dissolved in 1993 and released a best-of compilation called The Collection 85-93 in 1994. The duo competed in the Swedish pre-selection to the Eurovision Song Contest 1989 with the song "Okey, okey", finishing 5th at the final of Melodifestivalen 1989. 

The duo reunited in 2008 and competed in Melodifestivalen 2009 with the song "Show Me Heaven". It placed fourth in Semi-final 2 leading to an appearance in the "Andra chansen" (second chance) round, where it was subsequently eliminated. The song later peaked at number 6 on the Swedish singles chart. The Päivärinta sisters reunited again in 2013, performing a mini-tour. In January 2014, they released a new video together as Lili & Susie.

Discography

Albums

 Lili & Sussie (1985)
 Dance Romance (1987)
 Anytime (1988)
 Let Us Dance! A Remix Retrospective (1989)
 The Sisters (1990) - gold
 No Sugar Added (1992)

Compilations

 Non Stop Dancing (1990)
 Chance to Dance (1991)
 The Collection (1993)
 I vågens tecken (1995)
 Flashback #6 (1995)

Singles
 Sommar i natt (1985)
 Stjärnljus (1985)
 Om du kan (1985)
 Stay (1986)
 Candy Love (1986)
 Samma tid samma plats (1986)
 Tokyo (1987)
 Oh Mama (1987)
 Bara du och jag (1987)
 Enkel Resa (1988)
 We Were Only Dancing (1988)
 Jag drömmer om en jul hemma (White Christmas) (1988)
 Robert & Marie (1989)
 Okey Okey! (1989)
 Let Us Dance Just a Little Bit More (1989)
 Svullo (1990/Svullo + Lili & Susie)
 What's the Colour of Love (1990) - platinum
 Boyfriend (1990) - gold
 Nothing Could Be Better (1990)
 Something in Your Eyes (1991)
 Evelyn (1991)
 Can't Let You Go (1991)
 Where Eagles Fly (1992)
 Ride On My Love (1992)
 All You Can Say Is Goodbye (1993)
 Halfway to Heaven (1993)
 I Believe in Good Things '93/Megamix (1993)
 Love Never Dies (1996)
 Hypnotized (1996)
 Oh Mama (2000 Remix) (2000)
 Show Me Heaven (2009)
 Tease Me (2009)
 Bailamor (2011)
 Från oss till er (2011)
 Fly, Fly Little Bird (2014)
 Would You Be Mike (2014
 En liten kyss av dig (2020)
 Hela livet var ett disco (2020)
 Drömmar (2021)

See also
List of Swedes in music

References

External links

English Fansite with complete discography
Official Facebook page
Lili & Susie - discography
Lilli & Sussie to reunite

Swedish pop music groups
Swedish dance music groups
Swedish girl groups
English-language singers from Sweden
1985 establishments in Sweden
1993 disestablishments in Sweden
Musical groups established in 1985
Musical groups disestablished in 1993
Sibling musical duos
Sonet Records artists
Swedish musical duos
Female musical duos
Melodifestivalen contestants of 2009
Melodifestivalen contestants of 1989